The Two Orphans is a 1947 Italian comedy film directed by Mario Mattoli and starring Totò. It is based on the 1874 play of the same title by Adolphe d'Ennery and Eugène Cormon.

Plot
The story is set in Paris in the middle of the 19th century. Caspar (Totò) and the Baptist (Campanini) are two poor homeless staying in an orphanage, not knowing where to stay. One day the two orphans are called by the director to solve a very special case: Susanne, a girl from the orphanage would like to marry a rich young but his father is against it because he does not know anything about the origins of his girlfriend. So Gasparre has the bright idea to cut a lock of hair to swap it with that of Susanne and so the father of the rich man discovers that the owner of the hair is of noble origins and thus a relative. Caspar along with the Baptist enters the new family but the nobles Parisians have in mind to delete the new emperor Napoleon III of France and the two tramps are involved against their bungling. Being in the real room of the emperor, Napoleon immediately catches them and makes them stop, so Caspar and Baptist are sentenced to the guillotine. But just as the ax is about to fall on their heads, the two orphans wake up with a start: it was all a dream.

Cast
 Totò as Gasparre
 Carlo Campanini as Battista
 Vera Bergman as Una collegiale
 Franca Marzi as Susanne
 Isa Barzizza as Matilde
 Nerio Bernardi as Il ducca Filippo
 Raymond Bussières as Deval
 Ada Dondini as La direttrice dell'orfanatrofio
 Luigi Almirante as Il boia di Parigi
 Dina Romano as La domestica del boia
 Galeazzo Benti as Giorgio
 Mario Castellani as Il maggiordomo
 Luigi Erminio D'Olivo as Napoleon III

References

External links

1947 films
1940s historical comedy films
Italian historical comedy films
1940s Italian-language films
Italian black-and-white films
Films directed by Mario Mattoli
Films about orphans
Films set in Paris
Films set in the 19th century
Cultural depictions of Napoleon III
Minerva Film films
1940s Italian films